Soulton Hall is a country house in Wem Rural, England. It is associated with the statecraft of the Reformation and English Renaissance, by harbouring the conspiracy that delivered the Geneva Bible, the project of its builder Sir Rowland Hill.  The building is understood to be constructed in an elaborate set of humanist codes in order to carry meaning associated with drama, dance, classical antiquity, philosophy and scripture. Emerging scholarship is linking the manor to Shakespeare, and in particular the play As You Like It.

The manor has a history reaching to Saxon times, and is home to a "lost castle" and a modern long barrow and contemporary drama.

The manor of Soulton is pre-Norman in origin.

Sir Rowland Hill's renaissance hall

The present hall building was constructed between 1556 and 1560 by Sir Rowland Hill.  

This building was built 1556-60, but is only the corps de logis (private block) of a much bigger palace complex which has been muted and lost in intervening stages of development. It is constructed of brick, produced at the site with Grinshill stone dressings.
Hill was the first Protestant Lord Mayor of London in 1549, and, as Sheriff of London. Hill was the coordinator of the Geneva Bible project and an enthusiastic patron of the arts, in particular drama. 

He has been linked with the character of Old Sir Rowland in Shakespeare's As You Like It. He was involved in the case which established Parliamentary Privilege.

House of state, literary connections and inspiration 
Soulton was acquired by Hill and his protégé  Thomas Leigh in 1556 from Thomas Lodge.  Lodge's son, also called Thomas Lodge, would have been familiar with the woods at Soulton.  Lodge Jr was the writer and dramatist, who wrote prose tale of Rosalynde, Euphues Golden Legacie, which, printed in 1590, afterwards furnished the story of As You Like It.  

  There is also a plaque at the entrance to the hall in the following words:Now, my co-mates and brothers in exile,

Hath not old custom made this life more sweet

Than that of painted pomp? Are not these woods

More free from peril than the envious court?

Here feel we not the penalty of Adam

...

And this our life, exempt from public haunt,

Finds tongues in trees, books in the running brooks,

Sermons in stones, and good in everything.

- William Shakespeare, 'As You Like It', Act II, Scene 1. The Forest of Arden

It is believed that affairs of state that took place at Soulton in the time of Sir Rowland Hill, in the sixteenth century, inspired Shakespeare to write this play and shaped several others.

Hill was a close associate of Thomas Wriothesley, 1st Earl of Southampton (whose grandson Henry Wriothesley, 3rd Earl of Southampton has been suggested as the dedicatee of Shakespeare's sonnets) to the point of attending the private burial with the family on his death.  The third Earl's wife Elizabeth Vernon is assocated with Hill via her grandfather, who shared his childhood with Rowland Hill with them both being baptised at Hodnet within a couple of years of each other, and both families having stationed links to the area.  Another Vernon,  Margaret Vernon, a daughter of George Vernon, was the wife of Sir Thomas Stanley, whose  family repeated patronised Shakespeare, and is and is also associated with the writer to whom their epitaphs have been attributed to the writer in St Bartholomew's Church in Tong, Shropshire.

Within the building are traces of an older Tudor or medieval timber materials used in construction of earlier phases of the manor's various halls.

Examples of simple pargeting on this earlier building can be seen within the building.

Beyond this doorcase a Latin inscription can be read above the entrance hall which says:UT ROSA FLOS FLORUM, SIC EST ISTA DOMUS DOMORUMa similar inscription can be found in the Chapter House of York Minster. and Westminster Abbey.

Beyond this room there is a further inscription in Greek which reads:  
ἐὰν ᾖς φιλομαθής, ἔσει πολυμαθής,  
this is a quotation from Isocrates, which means "If you loving learning you will become wise" and echoes a 1600s carving on what is now Shrewsbury Library.

To the east of the hall is what is now a walled garden, accessed by steps from the terrace on the north, or by a Tudor gate to the north.

At the front of the hall is a Pillared forecourt, again part of the 1550s design concept.

History

Saxon and earlier

Within the manor is evidence Bronze Age habitation, and some signs of Neolithic activity.

The name of the manor is Saxon and means either 'settlement with a plough' or 'settlement with reeds' or possibly 'settlement in/near a gully' .

The manor supported the clergy of the King's Chapel of St Michael in Shrewsbury Castle.

The manor of Soulton existed at the time of the Domesday Book (see: PASE Domesday) and is recorded as "Svltune". The Domesday Book records the manor as being freely held by Brihtric, the brother of Eadric Streona, who was the Ealdorman of Mercia. Both Brihtric and Eadric were slain by King Cnut on Christmas Day, 1017.

Post-Norman
The building on the present site was pre-dated by Saxon ane perhaps earlier structures.  A Norman Adulterine castle was constructed approximately 300 meters to the north-east of the hall during the Anarchy in the early 1100s.

The location is marked by a mound which can still be seen.  This site is located around the point at which the roadway crosses a narrow gap in some wet terrain which would likely have had a strategic reason for establishing a fortification in that location. This building is believed to have burnt down at some point in the late 14th century.

A grant of the manor in 1299 indicates that some of the ancient marker posts marking the boundary with Wales were part of the boundary of the manor.

Post-1556 
There is an 1801 bridge on which Thomas Telford worked on the B5065, known as Soulton Bridge.

There are also the remains of a water mill active from at least the 1300s until the mid-to-late 1800s near Soulton Wood.

The manor is still owned by family of Sir Rowland Hill.

Features

Dancing Pavement 
To the south of the current hall is a cobbled yard.

Scholars have interpreted this as a dancing pavement.

Restoration door case 
In 1668 a semi-circular door case bearing the marital coat of arms of Thomas Hill, a descendant of Sir Rowland's and a friend of Samuel Pepys was added above the front door.  Thomas Hill was High Sheriff of Shropshire in 1680.

Priest hide 

There is a priest hide on the principle floor of the house in the south west corner of the building in a turret containing several chimneys, in the interior of the room (believed to be Sir Rowalnd Hill's studiolo) connecting to this hide there is a plaque which says:  Behind this tablet lies a space believed to have been intended to be used to hide scholars and priests from the authorities during the turmoil of the sixteenth century.

This memorial honours all who have suffered persecution for their beliefs.

Curtilage buildings 

Within the grounds of the hall are thought to be the remains of extensive medieval gardens although it is possible that the obvious forms in the fields near the hall may be the remains of a deserted medieval village.

These are a Scheduled Ancient Monument.

There are also some 18th-century farm buildings, of which a range of buildings now known as Soulton Court, which has a stone tablet dated 1783 relating to later work, incorporates a manorial hall unknown date prior to the mid-1600s.

A dovecot once existed to the east of the garden wall, it had been dismantled by the end of the 1800s.

Symbols

Flag and badge
The house flag is a square teal banner with an eight-pointed star inside a circle, with looping garlands between the points of the star.  This symbol is in use on plaques and a pavement at the site.

Coat of arms
The arms of Thomas Hill, sometime high sheriff of Shroshire were added above the senior door in 1668.

Archaeology 
The manor includes various protected archaeology.

An official excavation with Dig Ventures took place in June 2019. The excavation of a mound (a scheduled ancient monument) revealed the existence of a structure which might be a castle from the 13th to 15th centuries, according to an archaeologist. As the dig continued, medieval artifacts were also unearthed, including ampulla, a necklace, cups, bowls, and jug handles. These have been dated to circa 1250.

Culture and culture references

Drama and live performance 

In 2020, during the crisis in live performance and theatre resulting from the COVID-19 pandemic, outdoor performance was reintroduced to Soulton.

The National Youth Theatre (NYT) gave their first live in person performance since the restrictions following the lockdown that was brought about by the COVID-19 pandemic. T

The play was a new, specially devised work called The Last Harvest In 2021, the NYT returned with a performance of Animal Farm.

In October 2021 Soulton Hall hosted an immersive performance of the Old English epic poem Beowulf, together with a selection of shorter pieces of Old English and Old Welsh poetry, by early medieval living history/reconstructive archaeology group Thegns of Mercia, titled Beowulf at the Barrow. The performance took place around the site, with the historic Moot Hall representing the great hall Heorot, and the Soulton Long Barrow representing the dragon's lair and Beowulf's own burial mound, serving as venue for the final sections of the poem.

Dance 
An eighteenth century dance, the Soulton Jigg, is linked to the manor and published in John Walsh's 1740 "The Second Book of the Compleat Country Dancing-Master".  Material from the Soulton collection concerning its dancing pavement was loaned to the inaugural John Weaver Festival of Dance, (marking the 350th anniversary of the birth of the Shropshire-born "Father of English ballet").

Books 
The manor has been referenced in the following books:

 Regenesis: Feeding the World Without Devouring the Planet by George Monbiot
 Wilderland and Hill and Dale, both by Andrew Fusek Peters
 Riding Out by Simon Parker
 How to Love Animals by Henry Mance

Filming 
There is periodic filming at the manor, including of BBC Countryfile .

Culture and heritage 
Some affinity both architectural, and by family connections has been attributed to Soulton with various early colonial American buildings, in particular Rosewell (plantation) in Virginia.

Soulton Hall is a Grade II* listed building, along with its walled gardens, pillared forecourt and carved stone work.  Soulton Bridge, crossing Soulton Brook is a Grade I listed structure, built in 1801 by Thomas Telford.

In 2021, during the North Shropshire by-election, the various candidates and media were headquartered at the manor.

Contemporary monuments

Long Barrow 
A modern long barrow, Soulton Long Barrow, was constructed on farmland north of Soulton Hall. Begun in 2017, the site became operational in 2019.  The new monument was covered on an episode of BBC Countryfile being visited by Matt Baker and Ellie Harrison in April 2019.

Standing stones 

 

Three megalithic limestone standing stones are located on the access route to the barrow. These were added to the approach route to the barrow in autumn 2017. The stone for these monoliths, as with the barrow itself came from Churchfield Quarry, Oundle, near Peterborough. There is no deliberate alignment beyond way-marking for these standing stones.  In 2020, a standing stone, with an alignment to the setting sun on the winter solstice, was added to the ritual landscape to acknowledge the suffering of the families impacted by the Coronavirus Pandemic.

Farm

There is a farm at the manor, including Soulton Wood.

The farm practices no-till farming.  This was covered in an episode of BBC Countryfile in April 2019 with Matt Baker.

Research cooperation between Harper Adams University and Oxford University looking at the results of cultivation on Soil ecology, which used DNA sequencing of the soil biome has been hosted on the farm.

The woodland is largely oak with some cherry and ash. In total the woodland covers about 50 acres and it is designated ancient woodland. Material from the wood was supplied for repair of the House of Commons after bomb damage in the Second World War.

Gallery

Spellings 
Before the modern spelling of 'Soulton', a wide variation in spelling can be observed:

 Suletune (Domesday Book, 1086)
 Suleton' (Curia Regis Rolls 1200; Rotuli Hundredorum, 1255)
 Soleton (Assize Rolls, 1271–2; Feudal Aids 1284-5A)
 Sulton' (Assize Rolls 1271–2, 91–2)
 Sulton (Feudal Aids 1431, 1470, 84; Calendar of Close Rolls Preserved in the Public Record Office, 1703; Shropshire Parish Registers, 1809)
 Solton' (1334, The Shropshire Lay Subsidy Roll of 1 Edward III)
 Sowton (Saxton's Map of Shropshire, 1695 The County Maps from William Camden's Britannia 1695 by Robert Morden)
 Soughton; 1672, The Shropshire Hearth-Tax Roll of 1672)
 Soulton (1677, Shropshire Parish Register)
 Saulton (artifacts at the building, 1800s)

See also 
 Listed buildings in Wem Rural
 Hawkstone Park
 Old Market Hall
 Sudeley Castle 
 DigVentures
 National Youth Theatre 
 Worshipful Company of Mercers 
 Mathew Parker

References and further reading
 An excursion from Sidmouth to Chester in the summer of 1803 (1803) by Edmund Butcher. Whittingham.
 Antiquities of Shropshire, Vol. 10 (1860) by Robert William Eyton. J.R. Smith,.
 The Castles & Old Mansions of Shropshire (1868) by Frances Stackhouse Acton. Leake and Evans.
 Memorials of Old Shropshire (1906) by Thomas Auden. Bemrose & Sons.
 Transactions of the Shropshire Archaeological and Natural History Society, Volume 40 (1919).  Shropshire Archaeological and Natural History Society.
 Proceedings of the American Philosophical Society Held at Philadelphia (1939). American Philosophical Society. 1939
 Burke's Guide to Country Houses: Reid, P. Herefordshire, Shropshire, Warwickshire, Worcestershire (1978) by Mark Bence-Jones, and Peter Reid. Burke's Peerage.
 The Tudor and Stuart Legacy, 1530-1730 (1989) by Lawrence Garner. Swan Hill.
 The World of the Country House in Seventeenth-century England (1999) by John Trevor Cliffe. Yale University Press.
 Hills of Hawkstone (2005) by Joanna Hill. Phillimore & Co Ltd.
 Shropshire (Pevsner Architectural Guides: Buildings of England) (2006) by John Newman. Yale University Press.
 Design and Plan in the Country House: From Castle Donjons to Palladian Boxes (2008) by Andor Gomme, Austin Harvey Gomme, and Alison Maguire. Yale University Press.

References

External links 
History Page of Official Soulton Hall Website Retrieved 29 November 2013

Country houses in Shropshire
Grade II* listed buildings in Shropshire
Manor houses
Theatres